Dakyns is a surname. Notable people with the surname include:
Henry Graham Dakyns (1838–1911), British classicist
Winifred Dakyns (1875–1960), British naval officer